Anna Ascani (born 17 October 1987) is an Italian politician.

Biography 
Ascani obtained a Bachelor in Philosophy in 2009 at the University of Perugia, and a master's degree at the University of Trento in 2012. Since 2016 she is enrolled in the PhD programme in Politics at the LUISS University.

In 2006, at the age of 18, Ascani ran for a seat in the city council of her birth town Città di Castello in Umbria. The following year, with the birth of the Democratic Party and the 2007 primaries, she supported Enrico Letta.

Political career 
At the 2013 general election, Ascani was elected to the Chamber of Deputies. That same year, during the 2013 primaries, she supported Matteo Renzi, later elected Secretary. She supported Renzi again at the 2017 primaries.

In 2016, Forbes named Ascani as one of the 30 most influential under 30 European politicians.

After having been re-elected to the Chamber of Deputies at the 2018 general election, she ran at the 2019 primaries as the running mate of Roberto Giachetti. They ranked third, but Ascani was appointed, together with Debora Serracchiani, vice president of the Democratic Party.

References

External links 
Files about her parliamentary activities (in Italian): XVII, XVIII, XIX legislature

1987 births
Living people
People from Città di Castello
University of Perugia alumni
University of Trento alumni
Democratic Party (Italy) politicians
Deputies of Legislature XVII of Italy
Deputies of Legislature XVIII of Italy
Deputies of Legislature XIX of Italy
21st-century Italian women politicians
Vice presidents of the Chamber of Deputies (Italy)
Women members of the Chamber of Deputies (Italy)